Kim Sung-hee (Hangul: 김성희, born August 11, 1989), better known by his stage name Ja Mezz (Hangul: 자메즈), is a South Korean rapper. He released his first EP, 1/4, on August 11, 2015. He dropped out Hanyang University in 2017.

In August 2018, he participated in Japanese MC/Singer, Mitsuhiro Hidaka's song, "Name Tag".

Discography

Extended plays

Singles

References

1989 births
Living people
South Korean male rappers
South Korean hip hop singers
21st-century South Korean male  singers